Darryl Hewitt (born 29 April 1958) is a former Australian rules footballer who played in the South Australian National Football League (SANFL) and with St Kilda in the Victorian Football League (VFL).

His brother Glynn Hewitt, was also a footballer, and his nephew Lleyton Hewitt, was a professional tennis player.

References

External links 
		

1958 births
Living people
Australian rules footballers from South Australia
St Kilda Football Club players
Woodville Football Club players
West Adelaide Football Club players
South Adelaide Football Club players